McNary is an unincorporated community in Umatilla County, Oregon, United States. It is located on U.S. Route 730, near its junctions with U.S. Route 395 and Interstate 82. McNary was named for former U.S. senator from Oregon Charles L. McNary. Its post office was established on September 1, 1949.

Climate
According to the Köppen climate classification, McNary has a semiarid climate, BSk on climate maps.

References

Unincorporated communities in Umatilla County, Oregon
1949 establishments in Oregon
Unincorporated communities in Oregon